La corsa dell'innocente (internationally released as Flight of the Innocent) is a 1992 Italian drama film directed by Carlo Carlei. It was nominated at 51st Golden Globe Awards for Best Foreign Language Film. - Winner: Hampton Film Festival 1993: Golden Arrow Best Film, Golden Arrow Best Director - Winner:  David di Donatello Awards Nomination 1992: Best First Film - Winner: N.I.C.E. New York: Best Film Audience Award - Toronto Festival of Festivals 1993: Opening Night Gala Screening. 
Official Entry or Special Event at the following International Film Festivals: Mostra Internazionale del Cinema di Venezia, Telluride, Mill Valley, Denver, Tokyo, Montreal, Koln, Chicago, Palm Springs, Florence, Bogota'.

Cast 
 Francesca Neri: Marta Rienzi 
 Jacques Perrin: Davide Rienzi
 Manuel Colao: Vito
 Federico Pacifici: Scarface
 Salvatore Borghese: father of Vito
 Lucio Zagaria: Orlando 
 Giusi Cataldo: Giovanna 
 Massimo Lodolo: Rocco 
 Anita Zagaria: mother of Vito 
 Nicola Di Pinto: quaestor  
 Gianfranco Barra: Porter  
 Beppe Chierici: Don Silvio 
 Isabelle Mantero: Policewoman

Year-end lists 
 Honorable mention – David Elliott, The San Diego Union-Tribune

References

External links

1992 directorial debut films
1992 films
Films directed by Carlo Carlei
Italian drama films
Films set in Calabria
Films scored by Carlo Siliotto
1980s Italian films
Fandango (Italian company) films